Auntie's Bloomers is a blooper show hosted by Terry Wogan that ran from 29 December 1991 to 29 December 2001 and aired on BBC One. Most bloopers consisted of homegrown BBC programmes including soaps, sitcoms, dramas and news.

The programme's title comes from the affectionate nickname "Auntie Beeb" by which the BBC is often referred. The show was replaced by Outtake TV in 2002, a show similar in concept but with slightly less emphasis on BBC-only material.

Production
The first two episodes of the show were made by independent production company Celador. Their contract to produce the show expired after the broadcast of the second episode on 27 December 1992 and was not renewed, leaving the BBC to produce the show themselves from 1994 to 2001.

The shows carried a strong BBC theme, most notably throughout the mid-90s where the set was supposedly the BBC archive, and the opening titles consisted of a mysterious figure entering the BBC Television Centre and retrieving archive footage from a safe.

Transmissions
The show was repeated on Challenge from 2009 to 2011.

Regular

Sporting Bloomers series

References

External links

BBC television comedy
1990s British comedy television series
2000s British comedy television series
1991 British television series debuts
2001 British television series endings
Blooper shows
English-language television shows